Devta is a 1956 Hindi partly coloured swashbuckler film written by Sadasiva Bramham and directed by Pattana. The film stars Vyjayanthimala in the title role, along with Gemini Ganeshan and Anjali Devi in the lead, while Agha, Bipin Gupta, Krishna Kumari and M. N. Nambiar form an ensemble cast. The film was produced by Narayanan Iyengar with his production company; Narayanan Company. The music was composed by C. Ramchandra, with lyrics provided by Rajendra Krishan. The film was a remake of the 1955 Tamil film Kanavane Kankanda Deivam.

Plot
This film narrated the story of a king (Bipin Gupta) who loses his sight and needs a "Nagi Jyothi" (serpent light) found in "Sarpaloka" (serpent world). A young man Vijay (Gemini Ganeshan) working in the palace and in love with the princess (Anjali Devi) undertakes the hazardous journey of going to the netherworld and getting the magic light from the hood of a snake in the custody of the serpent queen (Vyjayanthimala). The queen is attracted to the young man, who pretends to be in love with her mainly to get the light. He succeeds in getting it and the queen curses him to become an ugly man. The princess marries the prince, but they are banished and live in a hut. Soon a boy is born. The devoted wife faces many trials and tribulations before she and her son help her husband regain his original form. And they live happily thereafter.

Cast
 Gemini Ganeshan as Vijay
 Anjali Devi as Nalini
 Vyjayanthimala as Naag Rani
 Bipin Gupta as Sangram Singh
 M. N. Nambiar as Veersen
 Agha as Bahadur
 Daisy Irani as Raja 
 Kumari Kamala as Naag Kanya
 Krishnakumari as Naagi
 Indira as Mallika
 Kamalkrishna as Balveer
 V. P. Balaram as The soldier
 K. Ramaswamy as The soldier

Soundtrack
C. Ramchandra composed the soundtrack of the film, while the lyrics were penned by Rajendra Krishan. Singers Lata Mangeshkar, Asha Bhosle, Talat Mahmood and Manna Dey lent their voices. It was also one of the last collaborations of C. Ramchandra and Lata Mangeshkar, they fell out in 1958 and parted their ways.

References

External links
 
 Devta profile at Upperstall.com

1950s Hindi-language films
1956 films
Hindi remakes of Tamil films
Films scored by C. Ramchandra
Indian adventure drama films
1956 adventure films
1956 drama films